Chadwick Arboretum is a  arboretum on the Agriculture campus of The Ohio State University, in Columbus, Ohio, United States. The main arboretum collection is located just across Lane Avenue from the Schottenstein Center with its other collections nearby. The arboretum is open daily without charge.

The arboretum proper contains roughly 1,000 trees representing over 120 species that grow throughout Ohio, with special collections of conifers and willows. As of 2005, it contained one Ohio State Champion tree, Abies cephalonica.

The arboretum also includes a Learning Garden and specialized gardens for annuals, hostas, perennials, roses, and wildflowers. Taken together, these gardens represent one of the most varied collections of flora in the state, with good selections of native Ohio plants, perennials, tropical plants, wildflowers, woody plants, and more than 400 cultivars of annuals.

See also
 List of botanical gardens in the United States

References

External links
 Chadwick Arboretum
 U.S. Geological Survey Map at the U.S. Geological Survey Map Website. Retrieved November 10th, 2022.

Arboreta in Ohio
Botanical gardens in Ohio
Ohio State University
Tourist attractions in Columbus, Ohio
Protected areas of Franklin County, Ohio
Geography of Columbus, Ohio
University District (Columbus, Ohio)